Louis Chapuis (17 November 1874 – 25 September 1915) was a French fencer. He competed in the individual sabre event at the 1908 Summer Olympics.

References

External links
 

1874 births
1915 deaths
French male sabre fencers
Olympic fencers of France
Fencers at the 1908 Summer Olympics